Rebecca Anne "Becky" Allison (born December 21, 1946) is an American cardiologist and transgender activist. She served as  President of the Gay and Lesbian Medical Association (GLMA) and as Chair of the American Medical Association's Advisory Committee on Lesbian, Gay, Bisexual, and Transgender Issues.

Life
Allison was born in Greenwood, Mississippi to Errol Ward Atkinson and Mabel Blackwell Atkinson. She transitioned in 1993 while living in Jackson, Mississippi.

Career
Allison graduated magna cum laude from the University of Mississippi Medical Center in 1971. After practicing primary care/internal medicine, in 1985 she returned to school to study cardiology, working in that field beginning in 1987. Later, she moved to Phoenix, Arizona, for a position with CIGNA and served as their chief of cardiology from 1998 to 2012, when she entered private practice. Phoenix Magazine named Allison one of the "Top Doctors" in Phoenix for 2006, 2007, and 2008.

Activism
In 1998, Allison created drbecky.com, a resource site focusing on the medical, legal, and spiritual needs of transgender people. The website includes a compilation of statutes for amending sex on a birth certificate, a brochure on facial feminization surgery by Douglas Ousterhout, criticism of the controversial 2003 book The Man Who Would Be Queen by J. Michael Bailey, and a section on spirituality. Allison's website is frequently cited in guidelines for LGBT health care. In addition to the GLMA, she is Chair of the American Medical Association Advisory Committee on Gay, Lesbian, Bisexual, and Transgender Issues, and assisted in passage of AMA Resolution 22, "Removing Financial Barriers to Care for Transgender Patients."  Allison is also active in Soulforce and organized the Phoenix Transgender Day of Remembrance annually with her partner Margaux Schaffer.

Selected publications
Allison RA (2007). Transsexualism. In Fink G (ed.) Encyclopedia of Stress (2nd Edition). Elsevier, 
Allison RA (2007). Transsexualism. In Pfaff D, Arnold A, Etgen A, Fahrbach S, Rubin R (eds.) Hormones, Brain, and Behavior (2nd Edition). Elsevier,

References

External links

Dr. Becky Allison: Local Action Hero  via Human Rights Campaign
GLBT Advisory Committee members  via American Medical Association

1946 births
21st-century American writers
21st-century American women writers
American cardiologists
Women cardiologists
LGBT people from Arizona
LGBT people from Mississippi
American LGBT rights activists
American transgender people
Living people
People from Greenwood, Mississippi
LGBT physicians
Transgender women
Transgender studies academics
University of Mississippi alumni
Writers from Mississippi
Transgender scientists
American transgender writers